Below is a present list of Alabama covered bridges. There are currently eleven historic covered bridges remaining in the U.S. state of Alabama.  Of those, six remain at their original locations.

The comparison between authentic and non-authentic covered bridges are by how they are constructed. Covered bridges made with stringers instead of traditional style trusses are considered non-authentic, although in some terms, a stringer construction is also a type of truss. Examples of truss construction on covered bridges include Howe, Town Lattice, Queen-post, King-post, Haupt, Burr, Brown and Pratt. Of the existing historic covered bridges in Alabama, the Gilliland-Reese Covered Bridge and the Old Union Crossing Covered Bridge are classified as non-authentic based on their current construction.

These modern covered bridges shown below either have or will soon have historic eligibility. According to the National Register of Historic Places, a structure needs to be at least fifty years old to be considered historic although there are other criteria as part of the evaluation to be listed such as integrity and significance. All are classified as non-authentic covered bridges with most of them being privately owned.

Below is a list of some historic covered bridges in Alabama which were eventually destroyed, removed or altered.

NOTE: Tallaseehatchee Creek and Tallasseehatchee Creek are two different waterways.  One is located in Talladega County, while the other is in Calhoun County (also called Tallahatchee Creek).

References
 Dale J. Travis Covered Bridges. AL Covered Bridges: Credits. Retrieved Aug. 13, 2007.
 Bridges to the Past: Alabama's Covered Bridges. AL Covered Bridges: Credits. Retrieved Aug. 13, 2007.
 Alabama Bureau of Tourism & Travel. AL Covered Bridges: Credits. Retrieved Aug. 13, 2007.
 The Decatur Daily. AL Covered Bridges: Credits. Retrieved Aug. 13, 2007.
 Auburn University: The Plainsman. AL Covered Bridges: Credits. Retrieved Aug. 14, 2007.
 Library of Congress - Prints & Photographs Reading Room. AL Covered Bridges: Credits. Retrieved Aug. 14, 2007.
 TopoZone. AL Covered Bridges: Credits. Retrieved Aug. 16, 2007.
 Rootsweb (USGenWeb Archives Project - Alabama). AL Covered Bridges: Credits. Retrieved Aug. 25, 2007.
 The Alexander City Outlook (June 6, 2001), page 1A. Retrieved Oct. 25, 2007.
 Alabama Historical Commission (1969). Alabama's Covered Bridges. Retrieved Oct. 25, 2007.
 The Anniston Star (September 4, 1975), page 1A. Retrieved Oct. 26, 2007.
 Alabama Department of Archives and History. AL Covered Bridges: Credits. Retrieved Oct. 26, 2007.
 Encyclopedia of Alabama - Horace King. AL Covered Bridges: Credits. Retrieved May 19, 2013.
 Wetumpka's Bridges. AL Covered Bridges: Credits. Retrieved May 19, 2013.
 Covered Spans of Yesteryear. AL Covered Bridges: Credits. Retrieved Aug. 12, 2013.
 The Historic Huntsville Quarterly (Fall-Winter 1993). AL Covered Bridges: Credits. Retrieved Aug. 13, 2013.
 The Anniston Star (June 14, 1964), page 3A. Retrieved Apr. 30, 2014.
 The Anniston Star (February 20, 1936), page 7. Retrieved Apr. 30, 2014.
 ADAH Digital Collections AL Covered Bridges: Credits. Retrieved Apr. 30, 2014.
 Library of Congress. AL Covered Bridges: Credits. Retrieved May 8, 2014.
 U.S. National Park Service. . Retrieved May 8, 2014.
 The Cullman Democrat (March 24, 1932), page 1. Retrieved May 8, 2014.
 The Cullman Democrat (October 7, 1937), page 1. Retrieved May 8, 2014.
 National Register of Historic Places. AL Covered Bridges: Credits. Retrieved Jun. 3, 2014.

External links

Bridges to the Past: Alabama's Covered Bridges
Alabama Covered Bridges List (Dale J. Travis)
ADAH Digital Collections (Alabama Historical Archives)

Alabama covered bridges
Bridges, covered
Bridges, covered